The Aichi Prefecture Gokoku Shrine is a Shinto shrine located in the Sannomaru enceinte, next to Nagoya Castle, in central Nagoya, Japan.

External links

 Homepage of the Aichi Prefecture Gokoku Shrine

Shinto shrines in Nagoya
Buildings and structures in Japan destroyed during World War II
Religious buildings and structures completed in 1958
Gokoku shrines

Beppyo shrines